SPAMasterpiece Theater (or S.P.A.M. Theater) is an American web series starring humorist John Hodgman where he does dramatic readings of unsolicited email spam received by Boing Boing editors in a parody of Masterpiece Theatre. The series featured images and videos from Creative Commons-licensed media.

Background

S.P.A.M. Theater 
In 2008, S.P.A.M. Theater debuted. Each episode features a dramatization of email spam. Originally, the series featured images and videos from Creative Commons-licensed media from the image hosting and video hosting website Flickr and the nonprofit digital library Internet Archive. The second episode "FOR MY DAUGHTER'S SAKE/DE@L OF A LIFETIME" featured the voices of  Russ Gooberman and Dana Devonshire. In the third episode "Love Song of Kseniya," Boing Boings Xeni Jardin reads her own email spam. In the fourth episode "The Proposition," Erik Sheppard of Voice Talent Productions contributes a voice.

SPAMasterpiece Theater 

On October 1, 2008, Jardin announced the official debut of the web series SPAMasterpiece Theater—almost a month before the American release of John Hodgman's satirical almanac More Information Than You Require. Hodgman described it as "true tale[s] of romance, adventure, infamy, and low-cost prescription drugs, all culled from the reams of actual, unsolicited emails, received here by us and people like you -- what we call SPAM." The hosted series included dramatic readings by Hodgman in a parody of Masterpiece Theatre. In 2010, Boing Boing Videos Jardin was picked as "Curator of the Month". She commended the series with "These were so much fun to put together."

Episodes

S.P.A.M. Theater

SPAMasterpiece Theater

Music 
The first four SPAMasterpiece Theater episodes opened with a chiptune remix of Jean-Joseph Mouret's "Rondeau: Fanfare" (1735) by Hamhocks Buttermilk Johnson.

Reception 
Vultures Matthew Perpetua praised the series with "Hodgman's deadpan delivery is typically excellent, but we're particularly fond of the deliberately pretentious juxtaposition of stock footage in the dramatizations. PBS might want to look at this." In a retrospective celebrating the anniversary of Boing Boing TV, BBC Onlines web producer Ellen West described SPAMasterpiece Theater as "It's like Adam Curtis doing a nonsense Power of Nightmares."

See also 

List of portmanteaus

References

External links
 
 
 

2008 American television series debuts
2008 web series debuts
American comedy web series